Pamela Freeman-Mitford (25 November 1907 – 12 April 1994) was one of the Mitford sisters.

Biography
Pamela Freeman-Mitford was born on 25 November 1907, the second daughter of David Freeman-Mitford, 2nd Baron Redesdale, and Sydney Bowles (1880–1963).

John Betjeman, who for a time was in love with her, referred to her in his unpublished poem, The Mitford Girls, as the "most rural of them all" since she preferred to live quietly in the country. They met when she was managing Biddesden, in Wiltshire, the house of her brother-in-law, Bryan Guinness, 2nd Baron Moyne.

In 1936, she married the millionaire physicist Derek Jackson. Jackson was bisexual and married six times. They lived at Tullamaine Castle in Fethard, County Tipperary, with Jackson's bisexuality and womanizing raising some suspicions that it was a marriage of convenience. After her divorce in 1951, she spent much of the next twenty years as the companion of Giuditta Tommasi (died 1993), an Italian horsewoman. Jessica Mitford described her as having become a "you-know-what-bian", although Diana was less certain whether Pamela and Giuditta were lovers. They parted in 1972 when Pamela returned to the Cotswolds to live at Caudle Green.

She died on 12 April 1994, in London.

References

1907 births
1994 deaths
English socialites
English lesbians
Mitford family
Daughters of barons
20th-century English LGBT people